Dennis Goodwin (fourth ¼ 1929 – 12 April 2011) was an English professional rugby league footballer who played in the 1950s and 1960s.

Background
Dennis Goodwin's birth was registered in Barrow-in-Furness, Lancashire, England, and he died in Barrow-in-Furness, Cumbria, England.

Playing career

International honours
Dennis Goodwin won a cap for England while at Barrow in 1955 against Other Nationalities, and won caps for Great Britain while at Barrow in 1957 against France (2 matches), in 1958 against France, and New Zealand (2 matches).

Championship final appearances
Dennis Goodwin played right-, i.e. number 12, in Leeds' 25–10 victory over Warrington in the Championship Final during the 1960–61 season at Odsal Stadium, Bradford on Saturday 20 May 1961.

Challenge Cup Final appearances
Dennis Goodwin played left-, i.e. number 4, in Barrow's 0–10 defeat by Wigan in the 1951 Challenge Cup Final during the 1950–51 season at Wembley Stadium, London on Saturday 5 May 1951, in front of a crowd of 94,262, and played left-, i.e. number 4, in the 21–12 victory over Workington Town in the 1954–55 Challenge Cup Final during the 1954–55 season at Wembley Stadium, London on Saturday 30 April 1955, in front of a crowd of 66,513.

County Cup Final appearances
Dennis Goodwin played left-, i.e. number 4, in Barrow's 12–2 victory over Oldham in the 1954 Lancashire County Cup Final during the 1954–55 season at Station Road, Swinton on Saturday 23 October 1954, and played right-, i.e. number 3, in Leeds' 9–19 defeat by Wakefield Trinity in the 1961 Yorkshire County Cup Final during the 1961–62 season at Odsal Stadium, Bradford on Saturday 11 November 1961.

References

External links
Leeds RL legends reunited
Club History, Facts and Figures
(archived by web.archive.org) Back on the Wembley trail
Fond farewell to our rugby league legend

1929 births
2011 deaths
Barrow Raiders players
England national rugby league team players
English rugby league players
Great Britain national rugby league team players
Leeds Rhinos players
Rugby league centres
Rugby league props
Rugby league second-rows
Rugby league players from Barrow-in-Furness
York Wasps players